The Tennessee Theatre was a 2,028 seat, single screen movie and stage theater at 535 Church Street, in Nashville, Tennessee was opened on February 28, 1952. It was built with the designs of architect Joseph W. Holman in the shell of the 11-story, Art Deco Sudekum Building, also known as Warner building, that was completed in 1932, The theater was demolished in the 1980s. The high rise office building was imploded on November 29, 1992  The Cumberland Apartment high-rise now sits on the site. The theater hosted the first Grammy Awards ceremony not held in either Los Angeles or New York City in 1973 — it would be 49 years until the Grammys were held outside those two cities (Las Vegas).

References 

Cinemas and movie theaters in Tennessee
Demolished theatres in the United States
Former cinemas in the United States
Buildings and structures in Nashville, Tennessee
History of Nashville, Tennessee
Movie palaces
Theatres completed in 1952
Streamline Moderne architecture in Tennessee
Grammy Award venues
1952 establishments in Tennessee
1980s disestablishments in Tennessee
Buildings and structures demolished in the 1980s